Andy Lee Tomberlin (born November 7, 1966) is an American former professional baseball outfielder who played mainly at right field for five different teams between the 1993 and 1998 seasons.
  
A hard-throwing pitcher converted to full-time outfielder, Tomberlin  entered the majors in 1993 with the Pittsburgh Pirates, playing for them one year before joining the Boston Red Sox (1994), Oakland Athletics (1995), New York Mets (1996–1997) and Detroit Tigers (1998). His most productive season came in 1995 with Oakland, when he posted career-numbers in home runs (4), runs (15), RBI (10) and stolen bases (4), while hitting a .212 batting average in 46 games. Then, with the 1996 Mets he hit .258 in a career-high 63 games.

In a six-season career, Tomberlin was a .233 hitter (71-for-305) with 11 home runs and 38 RBI in 192 games, including six doubles, two triples and six stolen bases.

Tomberlin also played from 1986 through 2000 in the minor leagues for eight different organizations, hitting .292 with 110 home runs and 473 RBI in 1048 games. As a pitcher, he posted a 7–2 record with a 4.01 ERA in 33 minor league appearances.

Following his playing career, Tomberlin served as a scout for the Milwaukee Brewers (2001–02), and has coached in the minors for the High Desert Mavericks (2003–04), Winston-Salem Warthogs (2005), Birmingham Barons (2006, 2009–2011), Kannapolis Intimidators (2007–2008) and Charlotte Knights (2014–2018). Following his time at the Charlotte Knights, he worked as park director at Noel Williams Park, home of the Piedmont Recreation Association, before resigning in 2021.

External links
, or Pelota Binaria (Venezuelan Winter League)

1966 births
Living people
American expatriate baseball players in Canada
Baseball coaches from North Carolina
Baseball players from North Carolina
Boston Red Sox players
Buffalo Bisons (minor league) players
Burlington Braves players
Cangrejeros de Santurce (baseball) players
Cardenales de Lara players
Detroit Tigers players
Durham Bulls players
Edmonton Trappers players
Greenville Braves players
Gulf Coast Mets players
Liga de Béisbol Profesional Roberto Clemente outfielders
Major League Baseball outfielders
Milwaukee Brewers scouts
Minor league baseball coaches
Minor league baseball managers
Navegantes del Magallanes players
American expatriate baseball players in Venezuela
New York Mets players
Norfolk Tides players
Oakland Athletics players
Pawtucket Red Sox players
People from Monroe, North Carolina
Pittsburgh Pirates players
Pulaski Braves players
Richmond Braves players
St. Lucie Mets players
Sumter Braves players
Toledo Mud Hens players